Dysphania subrepleta is a species of false tiger moth (genus Dysphania) in the subfamily Geometrinae. Records are from Indo-China and western Malesia including Borneo, with no subspecies listed in the Catalogue of Life, where it is a "provisionally accepted name".

Moths in this genus may look alike: a similar species is Dysphania militaris.

References

External links
 

Geometrinae
Moths described in 1854